Fok is the surname of:

 Alexander Fok (1843–1926), Imperial Russian general
 Anthony Fok, Singaporean teacher, businessman and private tutor
 Brian Fok (born 1994), Nigerian-born Hong Kong former footballer
 Canning Fok (born 1951), Hong Kong business executive
 Henry Fok (1923–2006), Hong Kong businessman
 Fok Hing-tong (1872–1957), Hong Kong businesswoman and social reformer
 Ian Fok (born 1949), Hong Kong politician, son of Henry Fok
 Joseph Fok (born 1962), Hong Kong judge and lawyer
 Katherine Fok (born 1941), former Hong Kong government official, Secretary for Health and Welfare from 1994 to 1999
 Kenneth Fok (born 1979), Hong Kong businessman and politician, grandson of Henry Fok and son of Timothy Fok
 Mei-Ching Fok, Chinese planetary scientist in the United States
 Fok Pui-yee (born 1950), former Hong Kong pro-democracy activist and politician
 Timothy Fok (1946), Hong Kong politician, son of Henry Fok
 Vladimir Fock (1898–1974), also spelled Fok, Soviet physicist
 Wouter Fok (born 1954), Dutch tennis player

See also 
 Huo, a Chinese surname pronounced Fok in Cantonese
 Fock, a surname